Kothapalli railway station is a neighbourhood station in Karimnagar in state of Telangana, India. It is located on Karimnagar–Jagityal section of Peddapalli–Nizamabad line. There is a construction going on for a railway line from Manoharabad in Medak district to Kothapalli. Kothapalli is a Municipality. It is 8 km away from the district headquarters, Karimnagar, on the Karimnagar–Jagitial–Nizamabad road.

References

 http://srinagavallilakshminarasimhaswamy.com

Railway stations in Karimnagar district